Sakura Square (Sakura Sukuea) is a small plaza located on the north/east side of the intersection of 19th Street and Larimer Street in Denver, Colorado. The square contains busts of Ralph L. Carr, Governor of Colorado from 1939 to 1943, Minoru Yasui, a Japanese-American lawyer, and Yoshitaka Tamai (1900–1983), a Buddhist priest who lived in Denver. Sakura Square also has a small Japanese garden, and it serves as the entrance to the 20-story Tamai Tower apartment building that occupies most of the block. There are several shops and restaurants in the ground and first floors of the apartment building.

Bust of Governor Carr

Denver's Japanese-American community installed the bust of former Colorado Governor Ralph Lawrence Carr as a tribute to his support of Japanese Americans during the period of their internment. At the time, Governor Carr was the only elected official in the United States to publicly apologize to the Japanese Americans for their internment, which many argue cost him the 1942 election to the U.S. Senate, but won him the gratitude of the community, and Japanese Americans everywhere.

The Annual Cherry Blossom Festival
Denver's annual Cherry Blossom Festival takes place in late June in and around Sakura Square and the Tri-State/Denver Buddhist Temple. During the celebration, many traditional Japanese practices are celebrated, such as the Japanese tea ceremony and ikebana (flower arrangement). During the festival, many food stands offering Japanese cuisine line the street, along with various vendor booths, community information tables, and a live music stage. In the evening, a traditional bon odori dance is held on the street, with many participants dressing in yukata or other traditional Japanese attire.

See also
 Japantown
 Sakura Park
 Bainbridge Island Japanese American Exclusion Memorial
 Day of Remembrance (Japanese Americans)
 Densho: The Japanese American Legacy Project
 Empty Chair Memorial
 Fred Korematsu Day
 Go for Broke Monument
 Harada House
 Japanese American Memorial to Patriotism During World War II
 National Japanese American Veterans Memorial Court

References

External links
SAH Archipedia Building Entry

Culture of Denver
Geography of Denver
Japanese-American culture in Colorado
Japanese-American memorials
Internment of Japanese Americans
Landmarks in Colorado
Tourist attractions in Denver
Cherry blossom festivals